is a Japanese former synchronized swimmer who competed in the 1996 Summer Olympics.

References

1974 births
Living people
Japanese synchronized swimmers
Olympic synchronized swimmers of Japan
Synchronized swimmers at the 1996 Summer Olympics
Olympic bronze medalists for Japan
Olympic medalists in synchronized swimming
World Aquatics Championships medalists in synchronised swimming
Synchronized swimmers at the 1994 World Aquatics Championships
Medalists at the 1996 Summer Olympics
20th-century Japanese women